Admiral Freebee is the debut album of the Belgian rock band Admiral Freebee, released in 2003.

Track listing
(All songs written by Tom Van Laere)
 "Get out of Town" – 5:34
 "Rags 'n' Run" – 4:33
 "Rebound Love" – 4:13
 "Ever Present" – 4:35
 "There's a Road (Noorderlaan)" – 2:39
 "I Got Love" – 2:12
 "Mediterranean Sea" – 4:19
 "Admiral For President" – 5:48
 "Serenity Now!" – 3:32
 "Einstein Brain" – 2:46
 "Alibies" – 4:53
 "Bad Year For Rock 'n' Roll" – 3:23

References
 [ Admiral Freebee (album) on allmusic.com]

Admiral Freebee albums
2003 debut albums